Lauren Blakely Hitchcock (March 18,1900-October 15, 1972) was a chemical engineer and early opponent of air pollution.

Hitchcock became president of the Air Pollution Foundation of Los Angeles in 1954, which had been formed to fight smog.  Hitchcock identified automobile exhaust and backyard incinerators as the cause, and advised that significant steps would be needed--comparable to wartime efforts--to fight the problem in a meaningful way.  In 1963, Hitchcock was appointed to the faculty at University at Buffalo, where his work papers are now archived.

Hitchcock was born in Paris to Frank Lauren Hitchcock, a mathematician and physicist, and Margaret Johnson Blakely, and was  raised in Belmont, Massachusetts.  He received his undergraduate (1920), master's (1927), and doctorate degree (1933) from Massachusetts Institute of Technology.   He taught at the University of Virginia from 1928 to 1935, and then moved into private industry.

References

External links
 Hitchcock (Lauren B.) Papers, 1923-1966, at University at Buffalo Archives 

1972 deaths
1900 births
Chemical engineers
Massachusetts Institute of Technology alumni
People from Belmont, Massachusetts